Gertrúd Emilia Eberle (born 4 March 1964) is a retired Romanian gymnast of German-Hungarian descent.

Career
Eberle took up gymnastics aged 7 following her mother. At the time she was coached by Judita Varkony and Pavel Rosenfeld, and later was trained by Béla Károlyi and Márta Károlyi, before they defected from Romania to the United States in 1981. She was included to the national team in 1976 and later became the first female Romanian gymnastics star to succeed Nadia Comăneci. She was often in Comăneci's shadow because, for the greater part of Eberle's career, they competed together. Despite this, she made a name for herself, garnering 13 individual medals at the European, world and Olympic level. Most notable among her accomplishments was winning the floor exercise at the 1979 World Artistic Gymnastics Championships, ahead of Nelli Kim and Maxi Gnauck, as well as earning a silver medal on uneven bars at the 1980 Olympics, where she was narrowly edged out by Gnauck.

Eberle was also on the gold-medal-winning team at the 1979 World Championships. Despite a fall on the balance beam in the team optional segment of the competition, her other scores were strong enough to keep the Romanian team in contention for the gold with the Soviet team. Ultimately, her compatriot Comăneci came back from an injury, taking only the compulsory segment of the team competition, and competed on the beam, where she earned a high score of 9.95, allowing the Romanians to drop Eberle's lower score and win the gold medal. It was a rare victory for the Romanians over the Soviet team, and one of the Soviets' only three World Championship or Olympic title losses between 1952, when a full women's gymnastics program was first held at the Olympic Games, and 1992, which was the last appearance of the unified Soviet team (under the guise of the Commonwealth of Independent States).

Although a strong gymnast all-around (she won all-around silver medals at the 1979 World Cup and European Championships), Eberle was especially noted for her work on the uneven bars, where her routines varied greatly from year to year and even from competition to competition. She often included very quick and unusual transitions from one bar to the other.

Later life
Like the Károlyis, Comăneci, and others, Eberle left Romania, moving to Hungary in 1989 and to the United States in 1991. She is married and has a son, Roland, born in 1999. She coaches in California with a fellow expatriate Hungarian from Romania, the gymnastics coach and choreographer Géza Poszár.

In November 2008, Eberle — who now goes by the name Trudi Kollar, incorporating her first name and her married last name — gave an interview to KCRA-TV attesting that Béla and Márta Károlyi regularly beat her and her teammates for mistakes they made in practice or competition. "In one word, I can say it was brutal," she told KCRA.

References

External links

Whatever Happened To...
List of competitive results at Gymn Forum

1964 births
Living people
Danube-Swabian people
Gymnasts at the 1980 Summer Olympics
Medalists at the World Artistic Gymnastics Championships
Olympic gymnasts of Romania
Olympic medalists in gymnastics
Olympic silver medalists for Romania
Medalists at the 1980 Summer Olympics
Romanian female artistic gymnasts
Romanian gymnastics coaches
World champion gymnasts
Universiade medalists in gymnastics
Romanian people of German descent
Romanian sportspeople of Hungarian descent
Universiade gold medalists for Romania
Medalists at the 1981 Summer Universiade
Sportspeople from Arad, Romania